The men's 800 metres event at the 1986 Commonwealth Games was held on 28 and 31 July at the Meadowbank Stadium in Edinburgh.

Medalists

Results

Heats
Qualification: First 4 of each heat (Q) and the next 4 fastest (q) qualified for the semifinals.

Semifinals
Qualification: First 4 of each semifinal qualified directly (Q) for the final.

Final

References

Athletics at the 1986 Commonwealth Games
1986